The 2010 Superstars GTSprint Series season was the first year of the International GTSprint Series. The season began at Monza on 28 March and finished at Vallelunga on 10 October. Alessandro Bonetti and Maurizio Mediani won the championship, driving a Ferrari.

Teams and drivers

Calendar and results

Championship Standings

Drivers' Championship

† - Drivers did not finish the race, but were classified as they completed over 50% of the race distance.

Teams' Championship

GT2 Class

GT3 Class

GTCup Class

GT4 Class

GTS Class

GT4S Class

External links
Official Superstars website

Superstars GTSprint Series
Superstars Series seasons